Pavol Pavlus (born 22 June 1974) is a Slovak former football midfielder who played for clubs in Czechoslovakia, Russia and Austria.

Career
Born in Myjava, Pavlus began playing football for local side FC Spartak Trnava, and played 21 league matches for the club before his 21st birthday. Later, he would make 24 appearances in the Czech first division for FC Slovan Liberec and FK Viktoria Žižkov. He also made 10 appearances for FC Chernomorets Novorossiysk in the Russian Premier League.

References

External links

1974 births
Living people
Slovak footballers
Slovak expatriate footballers
Association football midfielders
FC Spartak Trnava players
FC Slovan Liberec players
FK Viktoria Žižkov players
FC Chernomorets Novorossiysk players
Expatriate footballers in Russia
Expatriate footballers in the Czech Republic
Russian Premier League players
People from Myjava
Sportspeople from the Trenčín Region